Sam Butler is a professional Australian Rules Football player who plays for Hawthorn Football Club as a midfielder or forward in the Australian Football League (AFL). He is the younger brother of  player Dan Butler.

Early life and junior football
Sam Butler played junior football for the Lake Wendouree Football Club and St Patricks College, Ballarat. At Lake Wendouree FC, (according to GameDay) he kicked 46 (documented) goals. He then played for the Greater Western Victoria Rebels in the NAB League, where he made a name for himself to be a 'clean and clever utility who can play through the midfield or up forward'. In the NAB League, he was ranked first out of all mid-forwards for tackles, contested possessions, and goals. At the Vic Country Draft Combine, he put AFL clubs on notice when he recorded the quickest 20m sprint time (2.97 seconds) and came second in the running (87 cm) and standing (71 cm) vertical jump. At 18 years of age, Sam Butler was expected to be drafted by Richmond (pick 15), Fremantle (pick 19), Geelong (pick 22), or Carlton (pick 25). However, he was drafted by Hawthorn with pick 23 in the 2021 NAB AFL draft.

AFL career 
Before making his AFL debut, Butler played 5 matches for the Box Hill Hawks at VFL level. During those games, he kicked 5 goals and 3 behinds, averaged 11.6 disposals, and scored 269 fantasy points, with an average of 53.8. While Butler was playing during that period, the Hawks won 3 out of 5 games. After earning his spot in the side due to a strong performance in the VFL against Essendon, he was called up to AFL level. He made his debut in round 9 against Richmond FC at the Melbourne Cricket Ground, where he could not impact the scoreboard, after being denied a goal by an immense defensive effort from fellow debutant Bigoa Nyuon. However, Sam was able to retain his place in the side for round 10, where Hawthorn played the Brisbane Lions in Launceston. Sam was beneficial to a Hawks victory, scoring 2 goals and more than doubling his fantasy score.

Statistics 
Updated to the end of the 2022 season.

|-
| 2022 ||  || 30
| 9 || 6 || 5 || 42 || 34 || 76 || 16 || 15 || 0.7 || 0.6 || 4.7 || 3.8 || 8.4 || 1.8 || 1.7 || 0
|- class="sortbottom"
! colspan=3| Career
! 9 !! 6 !! 5 !! 42 !! 34 !! 76 !! 16 !! 15 !! 0.7 !! 0.6 !! 4.7 !! 3.8 !! 8.4 !! 1.8 !! 1.7 !! 0
|}

References

External links

Hawthorn Football Club players
Box Hill Football Club players
2003 births
Living people